Miredo is a Teredo tunneling client designed to allow full IPv6 connectivity to computer systems which are on the IPv4-based Internet but which have no direct native connection to an IPv6 network.

Miredo is included in many Linux and BSD distributions and is also available for recent versions of Mac OS X. (Discontinued)

It includes working implementations of:

 a Teredo client
 a Teredo relay
 a Teredo server

Released under the terms of the GNU General Public License, Miredo is free software.

See also

References

External links 
 

Computer network security
Free network-related software
Free software programmed in C
Network address translation
Network protocols